The season started on 20 April 2013 and is scheduled to end on 5 October 2013.

Teams
A total of 40 teams will contest the league divided into four groups, Eteläinen (Southern), Pohjoinen (Northern), Läntinen (Western) and Itäinen (Eastern). 30 returning from the 2012 season, two relegated from Ykkönen and eight promoted from Kolmonen. The champion of each group will qualify to promotion matches to decide which two teams get promoted to the Ykkönen. The bottom two teams in each group and the worst eight-placed will qualify directly for relegation to Kolmonen. Each team will play a total of 27 matches, playing three times against each team of its group.

FC Hämeenlinna and HIFK were relegated from the 2012 Ykkönen, while AC Kajaani and Ilves were promoted to the 2013 Ykkönen.

FC Espoo, FC Kiffen, FC Kiisto, HauPa, JIlves, LoPa and PK-35/VJS were relegated from 2012 Kakkonen.

FC POHU, Kerho 07, KäPa, Masku, MuSa, ORPa, PK Keski-Uusimaa, Sudet and Tervarit were promoted from the 2012 Kolmonen.

SiPS didn't take its place in 2013 Kakkonen. Its place was given for Sporting Kristina, the worst eight-placed of the last season.

ORPa took the place of FC Santa Claus for the 2013 season when the club went bankrupt after the 2012 season.

Warkaus JK was excluded from the Kakkonen due to breaking the rules of the association.

Stadia and Locations

League tables

Eteläinen (Southern)

Pohjoinen (Northern)

Läntinen (Western)

Itäinen (Eastern)

Promotion play-offs
Group winners will play two-legged ties. Team pairs will be drawn and the two winning teams will be promoted to the Ykkönen for season 2014.

Group winners

First leg

Second leg

FC Jazz won 4–2 on aggregate.

HIFK won 2–0 on aggregate.

Eight-placed teams
At the end of the season, a comparison is made between the eight-placed teams. The worst eight-placed team will be directly relegated to the Kolmonen.

See also
 2013 Veikkausliiga
 2013 Ykkönen

References
Kakkosen lohkot 2013

Kakkonen seasons
3
Fin
Fin